The 1991 FIBA European Championship, commonly called FIBA EuroBasket 1991, was the 27th FIBA EuroBasket regional basketball championship, held by FIBA Europe. It was held in Italy between 24 and 29 June 1991. Eight national teams entered the event under the auspices of FIBA Europe, the sport's regional governing body. The Palazzo dello Sport in Rome was the hosting venue of the tournament. Yugoslavia won its fifth FIBA European title by defeating hosts Italy with an 88–73 score in the final. Yugoslavia's Toni Kukoč was voted the tournament's MVP.

This was the first EuroBasket tournament in which currently active NBA players, that had also already played in an official NBA regular season game were allowed to participate, with Vlade Divac being the only NBA player in the tournament.

Venues
All games were played at the Palazzo dello Sport in Rome.

Qualification

Squads

Format
The teams were split in two groups of four teams each. The top two teams from each group advance to the semifinals. The winners in the knockout semifinals advance to the Final, and the losers figure in a third-place playoff.
The third and fourth teams from each group competed in another bracket to define 5th through 8th place in the final standings.

Preliminary round

Group A
Times given below are in Central European Summer Time (UTC+2).

|}

Group B

|}

Knockout stage

Championship bracket

Semifinals

Third place

Final

5th to 8th place

Awards

Final standings

References

External links
1991 European Championship for Men archive.FIBA.com

1990–91 in Italian basketball
1990–91 in European basketball
1991
International basketball competitions hosted by Italy
Basketball in Rome
Sports competitions in Rome
1990s in Rome
June 1991 sports events in Europe